Three acres and a cow was a slogan used by British land reform campaigners of the 1880s, and revived by the distributists of the 1920s. It refers to an ideal land holding for every citizen.

The phrase was invented by Eli Hamshire in letters written to Joseph Chamberlain and Jesse Collings during the early 1880s. Hamshire did, in fact, own . Collings used the phrase as a slogan for his 1885 land reform campaign, and it became used as part of the political struggle against rural poverty. He became derisively known as "Three Acres and a Cow Collings."

In What's Wrong With the World, G. K. Chesterton used the phrase to summarise his own distributist opinions.

See also
 "Forty acres and a mule", referring to what was granted to some emancipated slaves during the American Civil War.

References

British political phrases